In recreational mathematics, an almost integer (or near-integer) is any number that is not an integer but is very close to one. Almost integers are considered interesting when they arise in some context in which they are unexpected.

Almost integers relating to the golden ratio and Fibonacci numbers

Well-known examples of almost integers are high powers of the golden ratio , for example:

 

The fact that these powers approach integers is non-coincidental, because the golden ratio is a Pisot–Vijayaraghavan number.

The ratios of Fibonacci or Lucas numbers can also make almost integers, for instance:

 
 

The above examples can be generalized by the following sequences, which generate near-integers approaching Lucas numbers with increasing precision:

 
 
   
As n increases, the number of consecutive nines or zeros beginning at the tenths place of a(n) approaches infinity.

Almost integers relating to e and 

Other occurrences of non-coincidental near-integers involve the three largest Heegner numbers:
 
 
 
where the non-coincidence can be better appreciated when expressed in the common simple form:

where

and the reason for the squares is due to certain Eisenstein series. The constant 
is sometimes referred to as Ramanujan's constant.
 
Almost integers that involve the mathematical constants  and e have often puzzled mathematicians. An example is: 

See also
Schizophrenic number

References

External links 
 J.S. Markovitch Coincidence, data compression, and Mach's concept of economy of thought

Integers
Recreational mathematics